The Umatac Outdoor Library, located on Guam Highway 4 in Umatac, Guam, was built in 1933 by Francisco Quinata Sanchez and Umatac villagers.  It was listed on the National Register of Historic Places in 1999.

References 

Buildings and structures on the National Register of Historic Places in Guam
Buildings and structures completed in 1933
Libraries in Guam
1933 establishments in Guam
Umatac, Guam
Libraries on the National Register of Historic Places
Libraries established in 1933